Solanum pimpinellifolium, commonly known as the currant tomato or pimp, is a wild species of tomato native to Ecuador and Peru but naturalized elsewhere, such as the Galápagos Islands. Its small fruits are edible, and it is commonly grown in gardens as an heirloom tomato, although it is considered to be wild
rather than domesticated as is the commonly cultivated tomato species Solanum lycopersicum. Its genome was sequenced in 2012.

Breeding purposes
It will hybridize with common domestic tomatoes. There are annual, biennial, and perennial varieties.  Solanum pimpinellifolium is important in tomato breeding.

Its relatedness to tomatoes and ability to freely cross with them has allowed it to be used for the introduction of disease resistance traits in tomato varieties, as well as in the study of the genetic control of tomato traits such as fruit shape and size.  It has higher amounts of lycopene, vitamin C, and phenolic acids, as well as a higher antioxidant capacity than Solanum lycopersicum.  Its 900 Mb genome differs from the tomato at 0.6% of base pairs; in comparison, they both differ from the potato (from which they diverged 7.3 million years ago) at 8% of bases.

Considered the ancestor of domesticated tomatoes, it is valued for supplementing the limited gene pool of the domestic tomato.  Due to agricultural development, the wild currant tomato is becoming less prevalent in the native range of northern Peru and southern Ecuador.  In addition, seed collection is hampered by issues with the Convention on Biological Diversity.

References

pimpinellifolium
Plants described in 1755
Edible Solanaceae
Flora of Ecuador
Fruit vegetables
Tomatoes
Tropical fruit
Crops originating from Ecuador
Taxa named by Carl Linnaeus